The 2022 Nur-Sultan International Tournament was a professional tennis tournament played on indoor hard courts. It was the first edition of the women's tournament which was part of the 2022 ITF Women's World Tennis Tour. It took place in Nur-Sultan, Kazakhstan between 21 and 27 February 2022.

Singles main-draw entrants

Seeds

 1 Rankings are as of 14 February 2022.

Other entrants
The following players received wildcards into the singles main draw:
  Gozal Ainitdinova
  Yekaterina Dmitrichenko
  Zhibek Kulambayeva
  Aruzhan Sagandikova

The following player received entry using a protected ranking:
  Kathinka von Deichmann

The following players received entry from the qualifying draw:
  Berfu Cengiz
  Nagi Hanatani
  Anzhelika Isaeva
  Martyna Kubka
  Polina Kudermetova
  Ekaterina Reyngold
  Maria Timofeeva
  Ekaterina Yashina

Champions

Singles

  Anzhelika Isaeva def.  Greet Minnen, 6–4, 0–0, ret.

Doubles

  Ekaterina Makarova /  Linda Nosková def.  Anna Sisková /  Maria Timofeeva, 6–2, 6–3

References

External links
 2022 Nur-Sultan International Tournament at ITFtennis.com
 Official website

2022 ITF Women's World Tennis Tour
2022 in Kazakhstani sport
February 2022 sports events in Asia